Sally is a 1929 Hollywood film. It is the fourth all-sound, all-color feature film made, and it was photographed in the Technicolor process. It was the sixth feature film to contain color that had been released by Warner Bros., the first five were The Desert Song (1929), On with the Show! (1929), Gold Diggers of Broadway (1929), Paris (1929), and The Show of Shows (1929). (Song of the West was completed by June 1929, but had its release delayed until March 1930). Although exhibited in a few select theaters in December 1929, Sally went into general release on January 12, 1930.

It was based on the Broadway stage hit Sally, produced by Florenz Ziegfeld (which played at The New Amsterdam Theatre, from December 21, 1920 to April 22, 1922), and retains three of the stage production's Jerome Kern songs ("Look for the Silver Lining", "Sally", and "Wild Rose"); the rest of the music newly written for the film by Al Dubin and Joe Burke.

Marilyn Miller, who had played the leading part in the Broadway production, was hired by the Warner Brothers at an extravagant sum (reportedly $1,000 per hour for a total of $100,000) to star in the filmed version. The film was nominated for an Academy Award for Best Art Direction by Jack Okey in 1930.

Plot

Sally (Marilyn Miller) plays the part of an orphan who had been abandoned as a baby at the Bowling Green telephone exchange. While growing up in an orphanage, she discovered the joy of dancing. In an attempt to save money enough to become a dancer, Sally began working at odd jobs. While working as a waitress at a Childs Restaurant, a man named Blair (Alexander Gray) begins coming to her work regularly to see her. They both soon fall for each other.

Sally, however, does not know that Blair has been forced into an engagement by his family with a socialite named Marcia (Nora Lane). One day, theatrical agent Otis Hemingway Hooper (T. Roy Barnes), shows up and gives her a chance to audition for a job. Sally, however, ends up losing her job, along with the opportunity, when she drops a tray of food into Hooper's lap. Eventually, Sally gets another job at the Elm Tree Inn, managed by Pops Stendorff (Ford Sterling). Blair drops in one day and immediately takes an interest in Sally. He convinces Stendorff to have Sally dance for his customers. 

The theatrical agent Hooper recognizes Sally's talent during her performance at the Elm Tree Inn, and becomes her agent, convincing Sally to impersonate a famous Russian dancer named Noskerova (who has reneged on her contract) and perform at a party hosted by Mrs. Ten Brock. When Pops Stendorff discovers that Sally is missing, he crashes the party, intending to take her back to the Elm Tree Inn for a performance. Sally is revealed to be an imposter and Mrs. Ten Brock insists that she leave immediately.  However, before leaving Sally hears Mrs. Ten Brock announce of the engagement of Blair and Marcia. Sally is devastated, but terribly hurt, but later learns that she has been discovered by none other than Florenz Ziegfeld, a guest at the party. Sally's manager, presents her with a contract to star in Ziegfeld's next Follies on Broadway. After a successful opening night, Sally returns to her flower-filled dressing room, to the congratulations of her friends and manager. After they leave so she can change out of her costume, Pop Stendorff arrives with a large bouquet of red roses, containing a card from Blair (having ended his engagement with Marcia), apologizing and requesting the return of a single rose, to signify her forgiveness. Sally gives Stendorff a rose, exiting to change behind a screen. Stendorff states that he will deliver the rose even if it takes a week or a month, while silently waving Blair into the room. Sally hears the door close and peeks out from behind the screen, and is delighted to find Blair, who again requests her forgiveness. She gives him her hand, and the scene changes to that of a large wedding party exiting a church, to await the bride and groom: Sally and Blair. As the happy couple emerges, photographers rush them, urging them to kiss as the film ends.

Cast

 Marilyn Miller as Sally/Noskerova
 Alexander Gray as Blair Farrell
 Joe E. Brown as Grand Duke Constantine
 T. Roy Barnes as Otis Hemingway Hooper
 Pert Kelton as Rosie, Otis' girlfriend
 Ford Sterling as 'Pops' Stendorff
 Maude Turner Gordon as Mrs. Ten Brock
 E. J. Ratcliffe as John Farquar
 Jack Duffy as The Old Roue
 Nora Lane as Marcia

Box office
According to Warner Bros. records, the film earned $1,219,000 domestically and $979,000 foreign.

Preservation
Although never technically a lost film, Sally was unavailable for public viewing for nearly six decades. Warner Bros. sold rights to its pre-1950 film library to Associated Artists Productions. It was not until around 1990 that the film became available for archival and revival screenings. However, the film survives only in black and white except for a 2-minute color segment from the "Wild Rose" musical number, discovered in the 1990s and inserted into the print currently in circulation. Sepia-toned black-and-white footage is inserted to replace individual frames missing in the color fragment. 

In 2022 An Unofficial Reconstructed Colorized version has been Uploaded online.

See also
 List of early color feature films
 List of incomplete or partially lost films

References

External links
 
 
 
 

1929 films
1920s color films
Warner Bros. films
Films directed by John Francis Dillon
First National Pictures films
Films based on musicals
Films based on works by P. G. Wodehouse
American black-and-white films
1920s English-language films